Hunstanton is a town in Norfolk, England.

Hunstanton may also refer to:

Old Hunstanton, a village in Norfolk, England, from which the newer town derives its name
 New Hunstanton, an alternative name for Hunstanton, Norfolk
Hunstanton (Winnsboro, South Carolina), listed on the NRHP in Fairfield County, South Carolina